The 2019 Poznań Open was a professional tennis tournament played on clay courts. It was the sixteenth edition of the tournament which was part of the 2019 ATP Challenger Tour. It took place at the Park Tenisowy Olimpia in Poznań, Poland from 3 to 9 June 2019.

Singles main-draw entrants

Seeds

 1 Rankings are as of 27 May 2019.

Other entrants
The following players received wildcards into the singles main draw:
  Michał Dembek
  Hubert Hurkacz
  Wojciech Marek
  Daniel Michalski
  Kacper Żuk

The following player received entry into the singles main draw using a protected ranking:
  Daniel Altmaier

The following players received entry into the singles main draw using their ITF World Tennis Ranking:
  Sekou Bangoura
  Javier Barranco Cosano
  Raúl Brancaccio
  Christopher Heyman
  Pietro Rondoni

The following players received entry from the qualifying draw:
  Jacopo Berrettini
  Andrea Vavassori

Champions

Singles

  Tommy Robredo def.  Rudolf Molleker 5–7, 6–4, 6–1.

Doubles

  Andrea Vavassori /  David Vega Hernández def.  Pedro Martínez /  Mark Vervoort 6–4, 6–7(4–7), [10–6].

References

External links
Official Website

2019 ATP Challenger Tour
2019
2019 in Polish tennis
June 2019 sports events in Poland